Ayutthaya Province Stadium is a multi-purpose stadium in Phra Nakhon Si Ayuttaya Province, Thailand.  It is currently used mostly for football matches and is the home stadium of Ayutthaya United. The stadium holds 6,000 people.

References

Football venues in Thailand
Multi-purpose stadiums in Thailand
Buildings and structures in Phra Nakhon Si Ayutthaya province
Sport in Phra Nakhon Si Ayutthaya province